Walter Gyger is a Swiss diplomat and the current Ambassador of Switzerland to Russia, presenting his credentials to Russian President Dmitry Medvedev on 29 May 2009.

See also
Russia–Switzerland relations

References

1946 births
Living people
Ambassadors of Switzerland to Russia